Tryella graminea, known as the Grass Buzzing Bullet, is a species of the genus Tryella. It has rounded thorax and short, hard wings. Forewing length is 20 to 27 mm. Tryella graminea inhabits in Australia.

References

Insects described in 2003
Hemiptera of Australia
Lamotialnini